South Marsh Mill is a grade II listed tower mill at Arundel, Sussex, England which has been converted to residential use.

History

South Marsh Mill was built in 1830. It was working by wind until 1915, when the windshaft snapped, but was worked by engine until 1922. The machinery was removed c.1941.

Description

South Marsh Mill is a five-storey tower mill. She had four Patent sails carried on a cast iron windshaft. The cap was a beehive shape, winded by a fantail. The mill drove three pairs of millstones. The cap now carried is a hexagonal shape. The fantail is missing. Various extensions have been made to the tower.

Millers

Messrs Dendy & Pellet 1830 - 1840
Henry Bartlett 1840 -
William Watkins 1840 -

References for above:-

References

External links
Windmill World Page on South Marsh  windmill.

Further reading
 Online version

Tower mills in the United Kingdom
Grinding mills in the United Kingdom
Windmills completed in 1830
Towers completed in 1830
Grade II listed buildings in West Sussex
Windmills in West Sussex
Arundel
1830 establishments in England